The EMIDEC 1100 computer (became the ICT 1101 in 1962) was produced by the Computing Services Division of EMI Laboratories in the UK under the leadership of Godfrey Hounsfield in 1958, (first delivered in 1959) after one year's development. It used magnetic core memory and transistor technologies and it is claimed to be the first large commercial transistorised machine in the UK.

Core memory was a matrix of laced ferrite cores. Because transistors were relatively slow at that time, Hounsfield also used magnetic logic units to speed up the operation of the machine to achieve a processing power comparable with a valve/tube computer. These logic units consisted of a single ferrite ring (toroid), with up to fifteen connections to it.

Main storage capacity was 1,024 36-bit words - just over 4k bytes. Secondary storage was provided by magnetic drums, each of 4,096 words - about 20k. Anything else was stored on  magnetic tape mounted in the vertical drive, vacuum-sealed behind a glass door. Peripherals included punched tape readers, punched card readers, and line printers.

24 EMIDEC 1100 computers were sold to commercial customers including Domestic Electric Rentals, Boots, British Motor Corporation, Kodak, London Transport, Barclays Bank and the Admiralty. They were used for a range of commercial and industrial applications.

In July 1962 EMI Computing Services Division became part of International Computers and Tabulators (ICT) which merged with other UK computer companies in 1968 to become International Computers Limited (ICL).

See also

History of computing hardware

References

EMIDEC Computer News 1
EMIDEC 1100 Delivery list and applications

External links
EMIDEC 1100 Website
The ICL Computer Museum with EMIDEC

Early British computers
36-bit computers
Transistorized computers
Computer-related introductions in 1959
Magnetic logic computers